Minuscule 570 (in the Gregory-Aland numbering), ε 1220 (in the Soden numbering), is a Greek minuscule manuscript of the New Testament, on parchment. Palaeographically it has been assigned to the 12th century. 
The manuscript is lacunose. It was labelled by Scrivener as 479.

Description 

The codex contains a complete text of the four Gospels on 194 parchment leaves (size ) with some lacunae (Matthew 1:1-16; John 16:20-21:25). The writing is in one column per page, 24 lines per page. It contains Prolegomena of Kosmas.

Text 

The Greek text of the codex is a representative of the Byzantine text-type. Aland placed it in Category V.
According to the Claremont Profile Method it represents the textual family Kx in Luke 1, Luke 10, and Luke 20.

History 

The manuscript was brought by Tischendorf from the East. The manuscripts was examined and described by Eduard de Muralt (along with the codices 565, 566, 568, 569, 571, 572, 574, 575, and 1567), then by Kurt Treu.

Currently the manuscript is housed at the Russian National Library (Gr. 97) in Saint Petersburg.

See also 

 List of New Testament minuscules
 Biblical manuscript
 Textual criticism

References

Further reading 

 Constantin von Tischendorf, Notitia editionis codicis Bibliorum Sinaitici (Leipzig 1860), pp. 60.
 Eduard de Muralt, Catalogue des manuscrits grecs de la Bibliothèque Impériale publique (Petersburg 1864).
 Kurt Treu, Die griechischen Handschriften des Neuen Testaments in der UdSSR; eine systematische Auswertung des Texthandschriften in Leningrad, Moskau, Kiev, Odessa, Tbiblisi und Erevan, Texte und Untersuchungen 91 (Berlin, 1966), pp. 57–60.

Greek New Testament minuscules
12th-century biblical manuscripts
National Library of Russia collection